Afrim Tovërlani (Serbian language: Afrim Tovarlani) (born 17 January 1967) is a Kosovar Albanian football coach and a former football player.

Tovërlani has also worked as a sports editor for the Kosovar daily newspaper Express.

Playing career

Club
Afrim Tovërlani became a famous football player in Kosovo while playing for Prishtina where he had an illustrious career. He made seven Yugoslav First League appearances for the club.

International
On 1 February 1993, Tovërlani received a call-up from Kosovo for a friendly match against Albania, and made his debut after being named in the starting line-up.

Managerial career
In his career as a coach in Kosova Superleague, Tovërlani won 4 titles:

2007/08  FC Prishtina

2008/09  FC Prishtina

2012/13  FC Prishtina

2015/16  KF Feronikeli

Also Kosovan Cup

2012/13  FC Prishtina

2014/15  KF Feronikeli

References

External links
EX YU Fudbalska Statistika po godinama Od 1974

1967 births
Living people
Kosovan Muslims
Kosovan footballers
Kosovo Albanians
Sportspeople from Pristina
Association football forwards
Yugoslav footballers
KF Flamurtari players
FC Prishtina players
Kosovan football managers
FC Prishtina managers
KF Trepça '89 managers
KF Feronikeli managers
KF Ferizaj managers